Ministry of Public Health may refer to:

 Ministry of Public Health (Afghanistan)
 Ministry of Public Health (Democratic Republic of the Congo)
 Ministry of Public Health (Guinea-Bissau)
 Ministry of Public Health (Maharashtra), India
 Ministry of Public Health (North Korea)
 Ministry of Public Health (Sindh), Pakistan
 Ministry of Public Health (Thailand)
 Ministry of Public Health MRT station, Bangkok, Thailand
 Ministry of Public Health (Uruguay)
 Ministry of Public Health (Uzbekistan)

See also
 Ministry of Health (disambiguation)
 List of health departments and ministries